The Anglican Diocese of the Upper Midwest is a diocese of the Anglican Church in North America. It includes about two dozen parishes in the American states of Iowa, Illinois, Minnesota, Wisconsin, Missouri, and South Dakota. The state with most parishes is Illinois, mostly near Chicago.

History

The decision to create a diocese in the Midwest of the United States was taken on 27 April 2013, at a gathering of 117 Anglican priests and laity, at the Church of the Resurrection, in Wheaton, Illinois. The movement to initiate a new diocese was started by several parishes in the states of Wisconsin, northern Illinois and Iowa, under the leadership of Robert Munday, former Dean of Nashotah House, few months before. It had the support of the Southeastern Wisconsin Chapter of the American Anglican Council, whose President was Bill Chapin. The diocese was divided in four deaneries and his first elected bishop was Stewart Ruch, Rector of the Church of the Resurrection, in Wheaton. The diocese was approved at the Provincial Council of ACNA at 18 June 2013. Bishop Stewart Ruch was consecrated the first bishop at 28 September 2013.

Sexual abuse and investigation 
In 2019, a lay leader at the church of Christ Our Light in Big Rock, Illinois, Mark Rivera, was charged with two felony counts of criminal sexual assault of a minor and predatory abuse. 10 survivors came forward to report Rivera to the diocese, which only acknowledged some of the allegations. In 2021, Bishop Ruch took a leave of absence after admitting he had made a "regrettable error" and for an impartial investigation after it was found that he mishandled the allegations of sexual abuse, and failed to inform the members of his diocese about the allegations. The response to the investigation is divided, with some coming out in support of the bishop, while others question the transparency of the investigation.

References

External links
Anglican Diocese of the Upper Midwest Official Website

Dioceses of the Anglican Church in North America
Anglican dioceses established in the 21st century
Anglican realignment dioceses